National memorial is a designation in the United States for an officially recognized area that memorializes a historic person or event.  the National Park Service (NPS), an agency of the Department of the Interior, owns and administers thirty-one memorials as official units and provides assistance for five more, known as affiliated areas, that are operated by other organizations. Congress has also designated twenty-two additional independently operated sites as national memorials. Another five memorials have been authorized and are in the planning stage. Memorials need not be located on a site directly related to the subject, and many, such as the Lincoln Memorial, do not have the word "national" in their titles. There is a degree of overlap in development of some areas designated as memorials, monuments, and historic sites, and their characterization is not always consistent with their names, such as whether the site is closely associated with whom it memorializes.

The earliest and perhaps most recognizable is the uniquely designated Washington Monument, which was completed in 1884 and transferred to the NPS in 1933. The most recently established is the Dwight D. Eisenhower Memorial, dedicated in 2020. The Pearl Harbor National Memorial was created out of the World War II Valor in the Pacific National Monument in 2019 and was previously just the USS Arizona Memorial. The NPS national memorials are in 15 states and the District of Columbia. Washington, D.C., has the most, twelve, followed by Pennsylvania and New York, each with three. The affiliated areas are in four states (two additional beyond those with NPS memorials) and the Northern Mariana Islands, while the other sites are in nine states (five additional), the District of Columbia, and Midway Atoll. Creation of new memorials in Washington, D.C. is governed by the Commemorative Works Act, while outside the District there are no systematic regulations.

Among the NPS national memorials and affiliated areas, ten celebrate US presidents, eleven recognize other historic figures, six commemorate wars, five memorialize disasters, and five represent early exploration. Eleven of the twenty-two non-NPS memorials commemorate wars or veterans, another ten represent groups of people who died for related reasons, and one relates to Native American history. Several major war memorials are located on or near the National Mall, contributing to the national identity. The historic areas within the National Park System are automatically listed on the National Register of Historic Places.

"National Memorial" is omitted below in the names of sites that include it; others may separate the two words or just use "Memorial", and there is also one international memorial included. Self-appellations by private organizations that are not officially designated, such as the George Washington Masonic National Memorial and the National Memorial for Peace and Justice, are not listed here, as Congress has reserved the right to create national memorials.

National Park Service national memorials
The National Park Service manages 31 national memorials as official units. It also oversees two more national memorials as part of other units, listed with the other national memorials. A few additional units, including Fort McHenry National Monument, include "national memorial" in their enabling legislation, but are not otherwise called that and are thus not listed here.

Affiliated areas of the National Park Service
The National Park Service provides technical or financial assistance to affiliated areas but does not own or administer them.

Other national memorials 
Congress has designated a number of sites as national memorials but not as units or affiliated areas of the National Park Service. While some are maintained by other federal agencies, most of these were created by local governments or private organizations which sought federal designation for wider and official recognition; the naming typically does not come with federal funding, but Congress has provided funds or allowed private fundraising for certain memorial sites. The Department of the Interior has noted that Congressional designation of private or local government sites as "National" may mislead the public into believing they are affiliated with the federal government. Congress has also authorized the construction of many memorials or commemorative works on federal land under the Commemorative Works Act, usually in Washington, D.C., or nearby; these are not listed unless specifically called a national memorial.

Future national memorials 
These memorials have been authorized by Congress but have not yet been constructed and established. Three would become NPS units if completed.

See also

 List of areas in the United States National Park System
List of national monuments of the United States
 Presidential memorials in the United States
National Capital Memorial Advisory Commission

References

National Memorials
National Memorials